The 1950 Maine gubernatorial election took place on September 11, 1950. Incumbent Republican Governor Frederick G. Payne was seeking a second term, and faced off against Democratic challenger Earle S. Grant.  Payne went on to win re-election by a wide margin.

Results

Notes

1950
Maine
Gubernatorial
September 1950 events in the United States